The UEFA Women's Euro 1991 final was an association football match on 14 July 1991 at Aalborg Stadion, Aalborg, to determine the winner of UEFA Women's Euro 1991.

Background

Germany

Germany defeated Italy in the semi finals 3-0.

Norway

Norway faced Denmark in the semi finals it ended 0-0 and ended with a penalty shootout win for Norway.

Final

References

External links
Official tournament website

Final
1991
1991
1991
July 1991 sports events in Europe